Kapil Harishchandra Patil is an Indian politician and member of the Loktantrik Janata Dal. He is a member of the Maharashtra Legislative Council from Mumbai Teachers constituency and was June 2006 to July 2024.
He was the founder of the political party Lok Bharati. In 2017, Lok Bharati merged with Janata Dal (United). But when the split occurred in JD(U), he had stood with Sharad Yadav. For the MLC polls in 2018, he filed nomination as a Lok Bharati candidate and won.

References 

People from Raigad district
Janata Dal (United) politicians
Members of the Maharashtra Legislative Council
Living people
21st-century Indian politicians
Maharashtra politicians
Year of birth missing (living people)
Loktantrik Janata Dal politicians